Michael Storm (born August 9, 1939) is an American musician and actor.

Music career
After playing in a folk music trio called the Other Singers, Storm founded the Good Time Singers, a band formed to replace the New Christy Minstrels on The Andy Williams Show. From December 1963-January 1964 Storm also performed shows with Gordon and Sheila MacRae, supported by their daughters Heather and Meredith and musician Craig Smith.

Acting career
Storm has appeared on many television shows, but is recognized by many for his role as original character Dr. Larry Wolek on the ABC soap opera, One Life to Live, a role he played as a lead character from 1969 through 1992, and in a recurring capacity continually from 1992 until 2004. He was preceded in the role of Larry by his real-life brother, Jim Storm, who, in turn, had been preceded by Paul Tulley. In the storyline, Jim's Larry Wolek was badly burned in a fire and underwent plastic surgery, and Michael's Larry Wolek was revealed when the bandages were removed. This new plot device would prove so successful that many other shows, including Dynasty (and One Life to Live itself in later years), would use it when recasting key characters.

External links

Sources

References

1939 births
Living people
American male soap opera actors
Male actors from Chicago
American folk musicians